Natalia Tułasiewicz (9 April 1906 – 31 March 1945) was a Polish teacher in Poznań, Second Polish Republic, and a leader in the Catholic lay apostolate. A member of the Polish Underground State, she was murdered in a gas chamber at the Ravensbrück concentration camp. Tułasiewicz was beatified in 1999 as one of the 108 Martyrs of World War II.

Biography
Natalia Tułasiewicz was born in Rzeszów on 9 April 1906. She moved with her family to Poznań in 1921, where upon graduating from the Poznań University she worked as a teacher, and was a leader in the lay apostolate.

During the occupation of Poland, her family was among the many Polish families who were dispossessed by the Germans after annexation of Poznań; thrown out of their homes with only a few hours' notice. She was involved in the underground education in Kraków and was a member of the Polish Underground State. In 1943 she volunteered to leave for Germany together with other women who were forced to perform heavy work, to give them spiritual comfort. When the Germans found out about her secret mission, she was arrested, tortured, and condemned to death in the Ravensbrück concentration camp. On Good Friday 1945, she climbed a stool in the barracks and spoke to the prisoners on the passion and resurrection of Jesus. Two days later, on Easter Sunday, 31 March, she was murdered in a gas chamber. The concentration camp was liberated two days later.

Natalia Tułasiewicz is one of the only two lay women among the 108 Martyrs of World War II, beatified on 13 June 1999 by Pope John Paul II.

References

Further reading
 Bł. Natalia Tułasiewicz, Przeciw barbarzynstwu – Listy, Dzienniki, wspomnienia. Wydawnictwo "M", Kraków 2003.
 Natalia Tułasiewicz, Byc poetka zycia. Zapiski z lat 1938–1943. Wydawnictwo Wydziału Teologicznego UAM, Poznan, 2006.

1906 births
1945 deaths
108 Blessed Polish Martyrs
Polish civilians killed in World War II
People who died in Ravensbrück concentration camp
Polish schoolteachers
People from Rzeszów
Catholic resistance to Nazi Germany
Polish people executed in Nazi concentration camps
People killed by gas chamber by Nazi Germany
Beatifications by Pope John Paul II